Hanu Man (also marketed as HanuMan) is an upcoming Indian Telugu-language superhero film written and directed by Prasanth Varma. Produced by Primeshow Entertainment, the film features Teja Sajja, Amritha Aiyer, Varalaxmi Sarathkumar, Raj Deepak Shetty and Vinay Rai in main roles. The film is set in the fictional village Anjanadri. It will be the first film of the Prasanth Varma Cinematic Universe (PVCU) followed by Adhira.

Cast 
 Teja Sajja as Hanumanthu
 Amritha Aiyer as Meenakshi
 Varalaxmi Sarathkumar as Anjamma
 Vinay Rai as Michael
 Vennela Kishore
 Satya
 Getup Srinu
 Raj Deepak Shetty

Production

Development 
After successfully directing Zombie Reddy (2021), Varma announced his fourth film on 29 May 2021, coinciding with his birthday. It was announced that the film will be the first superhero film in Telugu cinema. In an interview with Deccan Chronicle said that "the film is inspired by the Hindu God Hanuman", adding "As for the title of the film, Prasanth says he chose it because it was a dedication to many who, when they think of any superpower or a superhero in Hindu mythology, we remember Lord Hanuman. In the film, the name of the protagonist is Hanu-Man", regarding the title of the film.

Cast and crew 
Anudeep Dev, Hari Gowra and Krishna Saurabh were hired for composing the music of the film. It is edited by SB Raju Tallari. Teja Sajja joined the production on the launch day of the film, as the lead actor. The name of the fictional village was announced as Anjanadri.

Filming 
The film was officially launched on 25 June 2021 in Hyderabad, with a pooja ceremony and muhurtam shot done. Principal photography of the film was also on the same day. As of August 2021, 40% of filming was completed. Filming of few action sequences and songs took place at Maredumilli and Paderu of Andhra Pradesh in September 2021.

During the teaser launch event held in Hyderabad in November 2022, Varma revealed that the production budget increased six times from the initial valuation.

Release 
The film is scheduled to release on 12 May 2023 in Telugu, along with the dubbed versions of Tamil, Malayalam, Kannada, Hindi, Marathi, English, Spanish, Korean, Japanese and Chinese.

North India distribution by Pen India Limited, Tamil Nadu distribution by Red Giant Movies, Kerala distribution by Wayfarer Films, Karnataka distribution by Mysore Talkies and Overseas distribution by Yash Raj Films in collaboration with Phars Film Co.

References

External links 

 Official production website
 

Upcoming Telugu-language films
Upcoming Indian films
Films directed by Prasanth Varma
Indian superhero films
Film superheroes
Films shot in Andhra Pradesh
Films shot in Hyderabad, India